Diffenbaugh is a surname. Notable people with the surname include:

Noah Diffenbaugh (born 1974), American climate scientist
Vanessa Diffenbaugh (born 1978), American author

See also
John Deffenbaugh, American politician